Alfredo Antonio Padilla Gutiérrez  (born July 29, 1989) is a Colombian football striker who plays for Boyacá Chicó F.C. in the Copa Mustang.

Club career
Padilla began his professional career with Junior in 2007, where he was promoted to first team by manager Carlos Valderrama when he was only 17 years of age. He joined La Equidad in February 2009.

References

External links
 Official Website
 Profile at GolGolGol.net

1989 births
Living people
Colombian footballers
Categoría Primera A players
Atlético Junior footballers
La Equidad footballers
Atlético Huila footballers
Boyacá Chicó F.C. footballers
Association football forwards
Footballers from Barranquilla
21st-century Colombian people